Stutterfly was a Post-hardcore/Nu Metal band formed in 1998, 
Stutterfly started in Kelowna, British Columbia, Canada, with four members: Chris Stickney (vocals), Jordan Chase (bass, vocals), Bradyn Byron (guitar, vocals), and Craig Langerud (drums). In 2003, Jason Ciolli (guitar) joined the band, and the next year Ryan Loerke took over on drums. 2007 saw Stickney leave the band and after recruiting vocalist Charles Furney the band decided to form Secret and Whisper rather than carry on under the Stutterfly banner.

History

Stutterfly was well established at MP3.com and was a popular download. With the help of Los Angeles-based Freeze Management, Stutterfly made a deal with Madonna's Maverick Records in the summer of 2004, and later toured with fellow labelmates Story of the Year.

Stutterfly's second full-length album “And We Are Bled of Color” was released in 2005 (to later be re-released on the bands' own label, The Elysien Project), music videos were produced for the songs "Gun in Hand" and "Fire Whispers". “And We Are Bled of Color” was a commercial disappointment, selling less than 100,000 albums, which subsequently lead to the band being dropped from their label.

Some time after releasing And We Are Bled of Color, Stutterfly was dropped from Maverick, with lead singer Chris Stickney leaving the band amicably in August 2007.  Charles Furney, formerly of thebleedingalarm, joined as the new vocalist later in 2007.

On Stutterfly's Facebook page they announced that Stutterfly is no longer a band. Former members of the band including Byron, Chase, Ciolli and Loerke continued to work together under the Secret and Whisper moniker but have since gone on hiatus. Chase and Loerke now play in Shreddy Krueger together along with fellow Secret and Whisper member David Ecker. Stickney now plays in Shapes and Shadows formerly known as Oceans Apart.

Discography

See also
Secret and Whisper

References

Canadian post-hardcore musical groups
Musical groups established in 1998